When A Man Falls in the Forest is a 2007 American drama film directed by Ryan Eslinger and starring Dylan Baker, Timothy Hutton, Sharon Stone, and Pruitt Taylor Vince. It premiered in competition at the 2007 Berlin Film Festival where it was nominated for the Golden Bear and later screened at the SXSW Film Festival.

Smashing Pumpkins leader Billy Corgan contributed three previously unreleased songs to the film's soundtrack: "Shangra-La", "Sky of Blue", and "Whisper".

References

External links
 

 When a Man Fall in the Forest on MovieSet.com
 When a Man Falls on allmovie

2007 films
2007 drama films
American drama films
2000s English-language films
2000s American films